7 Worlds Collide: Live at the St. James is an album released in 2001 by 7 Worlds Collide, a musical project of New Zealand singer-songwriter Neil Finn.  It is a live recording culled from a series of five shows recorded at the St. James Theatre in Auckland, New Zealand from 2 to 6 April 2001.  Notable members of Finn's band included Eddie Vedder, Johnny Marr, Ed O'Brien, Tim Finn, Sebastian Steinberg, Phil Selway, Lisa Germano, and Betchadupa (featuring Neil's son Liam Finn).

The album was credited to "Neil Finn and Friends"; Finn would later use "7 Worlds Collide" as the name of the ongoing collaborative project.

The title of this album, as well as the 7 Worlds Collide project, is derived from the line "When your seven worlds collide / whenever I am by your side" from Crowded House's 1993 single "Distant Sun".

Track listing

CD release
All songs were written by Neil Finn, except where noted.
 "Anytime" – 3:32
 "Take a Walk" – 3:53
 "The Climber" – 4:31
 "Loose Tongue" (N. Finn, Jim Moginie) – 4:22
 "Down on the Corner" (Johnny Marr) – 4:31
 "There Is a Light That Never Goes Out" (Marr, Morrissey) – 4:22
 "Paper Doll" (Lisa Germano) – 2:56
 "Turn and Run" – 4:10
 "Angels Heap" (N. Finn, Tim Finn) – 3:50
 "Edible Flowers" (N. Finn, T. Finn) – 4:57
 "Stuff and Nonsense" (T. Finn) – 4:20
 "I See Red" (T. Finn) – 3:31
 "She Will Have Her Way" – 4:48
 "Parting Ways" (Eddie Vedder) – 5:50
 "Weather with You" (N. Finn, T. Finn) – 5:26
 "Paradise (Wherever You Are)" (N. Finn, T. Finn) – 4:06
 "Don't Dream It's Over" – 5:31

DVD release
 "Fall at Your Feet"
 "Anytime"
 "Hole in the Ice"
 "Paper Doll"
 "The Climber"
 "Take a Walk"
 "Last to Know"
 "Down on the Corner"
 "There Is a Light That Never Goes Out"
 "Private Universe"
 "Parting Ways"
 "Driving Me Mad"
 "Turn and Run"
 "Loose Tongue"
 "She Will Have Her Way"
 "Angels Heap"
 "Edible Flowers"
 "Stuff and Nonsense"
 "Four Seasons in One Day"
 "Suffer Never"
 "Cry Wolf"
 "History Never Repeats"
 "I See Red"
 "Paradise (Wherever You Are)"
 "Weather with You"
 "Don't Dream It's Over"

Personnel
 Neil Finn – vocals, electric guitar, acoustic guitar, acoustic 12 string guitar
 Tim Finn – vocals, acoustic guitar, piano
 Ed O'Brien – vocals, electric guitar, e-bow, acoustic guitar, effects
 Johnny Marr – vocals, electric guitar, ukulele, acoustic guitar
 Lisa Germano – vocals, keyboard, piano, violin, electric guitar, ukulele
 Sebastian Steinberg – bass, electric bass, double bass
 Phil Selway – drums
 Eddie Vedder – vocals, electric guitar, ukulele
 Paul Jeffery – keyboard, organ
 Liam Finn – electric guitar
 Chris Garland – electric guitar
 Joe Bramley – bass
 Matt Eccles – drums

Charts

Weekly charts

Year-end charts

Certifications

References

Neil Finn albums
2001 live albums
2001 video albums
Live video albums
Parlophone live albums
Parlophone video albums